Benjamín Ignacio Cam Orellana (born 15 February 2000) is a Chilean football player who plays as a forward.

Club career
A product of Unión Española youth system, he made his professional debut in 2018 thanks of the coach Martín Palermo. In May 2019 he moved to the United States to study and play for Camden County College. In 2021, he played for Iowa Western CC. Since 2022, he plays for Ocean City Nor'easters.

International career
He represented Chile at under-17 level in the 2017 South American Championship.

Personal life
His older brother, Nicolás, also plays football and moved to the United States in 2018, before Benjamín, to study and play for University of Rio Grande.

References

External links
 
 Benjamín Cam at PlaymakerStats

2000 births
Living people
Footballers from Santiago
Chilean footballers
Chilean expatriate footballers
Chile youth international footballers
Unión Española footballers
Ocean City Nor'easters players
Camden County College alumni
Chilean Primera División players
USL League Two players
Chilean expatriate sportspeople in the United States
Expatriate soccer players in the United States
Association football forwards